The Chinese National Liberation Vanguard, known in its abbreviation as "Minxian", was a youth organization created with the help of the Chinese Communist Party to broaden anti-Japanese alliance in the 1930s. The organization laid the foundation for both the National Salvation Youth Corps, and later the Communist Youth League of China.

History 
The founding of the Chinese National Liberation Vanguard was first proposed by the Chinese Communist Party on November 1, 1935, to broaden the anti-Japanese alliance during World War II. The Central Committee issued the document, "A Decision concerning the Work of the Youth" (关于青年工作的决定), which effectively expanded the Communist Youth League (founded in 1920) into a more inclusive, nation-wide youth organization. The League was officially established in Beiping on February 1, 1936. The "Declaration of the Founding of the Chinese National Liberation Vanguard" begins with, "The crisis facing the Chinese nation has come to its pivotal moment!" and proceeds to call for youth participation in the anti-Japanese war.

Notable members 
The League was led for a while by Li Chang. The prominent scientist Qian Weichang, Tsinghua University president Jiang Nanxiang, economist Yu Guangyuan and Qian Jiaju were all early organizers of the League.

References 

Youth organizations based in China
1936 establishments in China